Abdulakreem Al-Khaibari (born 30 August 1988) is a Saudi Arabian footballer who plays as a left back.

Career
He formerly played for Al-Qadsiah, Al-Nassr, again Al-Qadsiah, Al-Nahda, Sdoos, Al-Thoqbah, Arar, and Mudhar.

References

External links
 

1988 births
Living people
Saudi Arabian footballers
Olympic footballers of Saudi Arabia
Association football fullbacks
Al-Qadsiah FC players
Al Nassr FC players
Al-Nahda Club (Saudi Arabia) players
Sdoos Club players
Al-Thoqbah Club players
Arar FC players
Mudhar Club players
Saudi Professional League players
Saudi First Division League players
Saudi Second Division players
Saudi Third Division players
Saudi Fourth Division players